Tundla is a town and a municipal board in Firozabad district in the Indian state of Uttar Pradesh.

Location 
Tundla is situated on NH2 which connects it to nearest major city of Agra, 24 km away, 17 km away from District Firozabad and 5 km away from Etmadpur. It also serves as a major railway junction in North Central Railway zone. Numerous trains ply from capital city New Delhi which is 210 km away. Tundla is very near to Taj Yamuna Expressway. Tundla is well connected to other major cities of the country via regular trains. Due to proximity to Agra and hence the borders of Uttar Pradesh with Rajasthan, Madhya Pradesh states several inter-state bus services also serve the city. Intra-city transport typically consists of rickshaws and three-wheelers.

History 

Tundla is a town in Tundla tahsil of Firozabad district, Uttar Pradesh. In 1901 the population of Tundla was 3044. It was a major junction on the East Indian Railway. Tundla has a rich heritage of British rule. High walled British constructions, huge barracks, a Catholic church built in 1860, an old Jain temple, Kothis (Bungalows) of officers surrounded by sprawling lawns adorn Tundla as the main center of British administration. These old and beautiful British buildings have now been converted into railway quarters. Tundla also have a very old NCR College which was also made by the british for their training purposes.

Demographics 

The Tundla Nagar Palika Parishad has population of 50,423 of which 26,510 are males while 23,913 are females as per report released by Census India 2011. Population of Children with age of 0-6 is 6154 which is 12.20% of total population of Tundla (NPP). In Tundla Nagar Palika Parishad, Female Sex Ratio is of 902 against state average of 912. Moreover, Child Sex Ratio in Tundla is around 871 compared to Uttar Pradesh state average of 902. Literacy rate of Tundla city is 86.43% higher than state average of 67.68%. In Tundla, Male literacy is around 91.71% while female literacy rate is 80.61%.

Politics
Tundla (Assembly constituency) represents the area

Transportation 
Tundla Junction is an important station in Uttar Pradesh. It is located on the Delhi–Kanpur main line 25 km from Agra City. Tundla is a technical halt for changing drivers and guards for almost all of the trains on the New Delhi–Pandit Deen Dayal Junction / Lucknow sections. The station was built by the British and remains essentially unchanged. The railway station is a site in itself and takes one back to the pre-independence era.
Tundla Junction is important for the people of Agra and for tourists providing connections to the east of the country, i.e. Kolkata, Guwahati, Patna etc., and especially to the northern state of Uttar Pradesh. It has connections to Agra Cantonment, Etawah, Aligarh Junction, Phaphund,tundla, Kanpur Central railway station etc.

References 

Cities and towns in Firozabad district